Agun Niye Khela is a 1967 Bangladeshi film directed by Nurul Haque Bachchu and Amjad Hossain and stars Razzak and Sujata.

Music
It is the debut film of veteran singer Sabina Yasmin. Composer Altaf Mahmud gave her a chance to sing the song "Modhu Jochnar Dipaboli". Several days went by, the singer feared that her song may be cut of the film. But the music director then gave her another song "Ekti Pakhi Dupure Rode Shongihara Eka" with then established singer Mahmudun Nabi.

References

External links
 

1967 films
Bengali-language Pakistani films
Bangladeshi drama films
Films scored by Altaf Mahmud
1960s Bengali-language films